Krisada Boonyarat (born 5 July 1957) is a former Thai civil servant who served as Permanent Secretary of the Ministry of Interior, and was the Minister of Agriculture and Cooperatives in the first cabinet of Prime Minister Prayut Chan-o-cha. Chalermchai Sri-on was appointed as his successor.

References 

Living people
1957 births
Place of birth missing (living people)
Krisada Boonyarat
Krisada Boonyarat
Krisada Boonyarat
Krisada Boonyarat